Tennis was contested at the 1998 Asian Games in Bangkok, Thailand from 8 to 18 December 1998.  Tennis had team, doubles, and singles events for men and women, as well as a mixed doubles competition.

South Korea finished first in the medal table winning two gold medals.

Medalists

Medal table

See also
 Tennis at the Asian Games

References
 Results

External links
Asian Games medalists in tennis

 
1998 Asian Games events
1998
Asian Games
1998 Asian Games